The Bluefin-21 is an autonomous underwater vehicle (AUV) developed by Bluefin Robotics for defence, commercial or scientific use. It found its most famous use in April 2014 in the search for the wreckage of the missing Malaysia Airlines Flight 370.

Design
The Bluefin-21 is torpedo shaped and has interchangeable payload and battery components. This allows for the rapid deployment of the robot in time-bound missions.
It has a modular design that can be adapted to carry a variety of sensors and payloads at one time, making it suitable for diverse deep-sea missions including offshore survey, marine salvage detection, marine archeology survey, oceanography, mine countermeasures, and the detection of unexploded ordnance. It is said to take two hours to descend to the bottom of the ocean and a further two hours to  surface, with the ability to search for sixteen hours.

Payload and navigation
The typical payload of the Bluefin-21 consists of an EdgeTech 2200-M sonar, EdgeTech DW-216 sub-bottom profiler and Reson 7125 echoer. It can also be fitted with a Prosilica black and white camera. It has an onboard storage with a capacity of four gigabytes using a flash memory and can be fitted with additional storage space. Bluefin-21 uses an inertial navigation system for navigation. In addition it uses an ultrashort baseline system (USBL) for more accuracy.

Notable uses
Artemis, a Bluefin-21 owned by Phoenix International,
 was used aboard ADV Ocean Shield in the search for the wreck of Malaysia Airlines Flight 370 by mapping the Zenith Plateau with a side-scan sonar, mapping 90 square kilometres a day. On its fifth mission, Artemis reached a depth of  after failing to find any wreckage in the previous attempts. It is believed to have cost 1 million USD for this mission alone. On 22 April, it was reported that Artemis was on its ninth mission. Artemis was used on 25 missions over 21 operational days, accumulating 370 hours of search time while covering 250 square miles.

Specifications
The specifications of the Bluefin-21 are:
 Length: 
 Diameter: 
 Weight (dry):  (buoyancy weight 
 Maximum speed: 
 Endurance: 25 hours at 3 knots
 Depth rating: 
 Energy capacity: 9 × lithium polymer batteries each rated at 
 Total energy capacity:

See also
 Knifefish (robot), another autonomous underwater vehicle built by Bluefin Robotics

References

External links

 Bluefin Robotics website 

Unmanned underwater vehicles
Robotic submarines
Search for Malaysia Airlines Flight 370
Robots of the United States